In Square Circle is the twentieth studio album by American singer-songwriter Stevie Wonder, released in 1985. The album features the hit singles "Part-Time Lover" (No. 1), "Go Home" (No. 10), "Overjoyed" (No. 24), and "Land of La La" (No. 86). The album earned Wonder a Grammy for Best Male R&B Vocal Performance at the 1986 Grammy Awards.

In Square Circle made the top five on the Pop Albums chart, and spent 12 weeks at number one on the Top R&B Albums chart. On the UK Albums Chart, it peaked at number five.

Track listing
All songs written, produced and arranged by Stevie Wonder.

Side one
"Part-Time Lover" – 4:09
"I Love You Too Much" – 5:30
"Whereabouts" – 4:17
"Stranger on the Shore of Love" – 5:01
"Never in Your Sun" – 4:07

Side two
"Spiritual Walkers" – 5:12
"Land of La La" – 5:14
"Go Home" – 5:18
"Overjoyed" – 3:43
"It's Wrong (Apartheid)" – 3:29

Musicians
"Part-Time Lover"
 Stevie Wonder – lead vocal, synthesizers, drums
 Luther Vandross – lead vocal, background vocal
 Syreeta Wright – background vocal
 Philip Bailey – background vocal
 Keith John – background vocal
 Melody McCully, Billy Durham, Peter Byrne, Renee Hardaway, Darryl Phinnessee – background vocal
"I Love You Too Much"
 Stevie Wonder – lead vocal, background vocal, synthesizers, drums, percussion
"Whereabouts"
 Stevie Wonder – lead vocal, synthesizers, drums, percussion
 Keith John – background vocal
 Darryl Phinnessee – background vocal
 Deniece Williams – background vocal
 Howard Smith – background vocal
"Stranger on the Shore of Love"
 Stevie Wonder – lead vocal, background vocal, synthesizers, drums, harpsichord, accordion
"Never in Your Sun"
 Stevie Wonder – lead vocal, background vocal, synthesizers, drums, percussion, harmonica
"Spiritual Walkers"
 Stevie Wonder – lead vocal, Yamaha CS-80 synthesizer, drums, percussion
 Edwin Birdsong – Yamaha CS-80 synthesizer
 Larry Gittens – trumpet
 Bob Malach – saxophone
 Janice Moore, Cheta Akins, Carolyn Garrett, Ruthell Holmes, Kay Gibbs, Valencia Cox – background vocal
"Land of La La"
 Stevie Wonder – lead vocal, background vocal, synthesizers, electric piano, percussion, drums
 Ben Bridges – guitar
 Rick Zunigar – guitar
 Renee Hardaway – background vocal
"Go Home"
 Stevie Wonder – lead vocal, background vocal, synthesizers, drums, vocoder
 Bob Malach – saxophone
 Larry Gittens – trumpet
"Overjoyed"
 Stevie Wonder – lead vocal, background vocal, acoustic piano, environmental percussion (incl.: crickets, bird sounds, ocean, pebbles in pond, stone dropped, crushing leaves), Yamaha CS-80 synthesizer
 Earl Klugh – guitar
 Paul Riser – string arrangement
"It's Wrong (Apartheid)"
 Stevie Wonder – lead vocal, synthesizers, drums, percussion, kora
 Musa Dludla, Thandeka Ngono-Raasch, Linda Bottoman-Tshabalala, Muntu Myuyana, Lorraine Mahlangu-Richards, Fana Kekana, Tsepo Mokone – background vocal

Personnel 
 Stevie Wonder – producer, performer, writer, composer
 Bob Bralove, Brad Buxer, Abdoulaye Soumare – synthesizer programming
 Gary Olazabal – synthesizer programming, recording engineer, associate producer, audio mixing
 Bobby Holland – photography (album cover/booklet), concept designer (album cover)
 Renee Hardaway – concept designer (album cover) 
 Johnny Lee – art direction (album cover)

Notable performances 
"Go Home" was performed during the 1986 Grammy Awards ceremony as part of a synthesizer jam with Thomas Dolby, Herbie Hancock, and Howard Jones. It was also performed, along with "Overjoyed," on the May 7, 1983, episode of Saturday Night Live, which Wonder hosted.

Charts

Weekly charts

Year-end charts

Certifications

See also 
List of Billboard number-one R&B albums of 1985
List of Billboard number-one R&B albums of 1986

References

Stevie Wonder albums
1985 albums
Motown albums
Albums produced by Stevie Wonder
Tamla Records albums